John Bussing Haskin (August 27, 1821 – September 18, 1895) was an American lawyer and politician who served two terms as a U.S. Representative from New York from 1857 to 1861.

Biography 
Born in Fordham, Bronx, New York, Haskin attended the public schools.  He studied law, was admitted to the bar in 1843 and commenced practice in New York City.

Political career 
In 1847, he elected a Civil Justice of New York City, serving on the bench until the office was abolished in 1849.

He subsequently relocated to the Bronx.  When West Farms was incorporated, he served as Town Supervisor from 1850 to 1851 and 1857 to 1860, and he was the town's Corporation Counsel from 1853 to 1856.

Tenure in Congress 
Haskin was elected as a Democrat to the Thirty-fifth Congress and re-elected as an Anti-Lecompton Democrat to the Thirty-sixth Congress, serving from March 4, 1857, to March 3, 1861.  During his tenure, he served as Chairman of the Committee on Expenditures in the Department of the Navy (Thirty-fifth Congress) and the Committee on Public Expenditures (Thirty-sixth Congress).

Later career and death 
After leaving Congress, Haskin resumed practicing law, and was elected to another term as Town Supervisor in 1863.

Haskin died at Friends Lake in Chestertown, New York, on September 18, 1895.  He was interred in Woodlawn Cemetery.

References

John Bussing Haskin at Find A Grave
John Bussing Haskin at Political Graveyard
John Thomas Scharf, editor, History of Westchester County, New York, Volume 1 Part 2, 1886, pages 549-550

1821 births
1895 deaths
New York (state) lawyers
New York (state) state court judges
Town supervisors in New York (state)
Burials at Woodlawn Cemetery (Bronx, New York)
Democratic Party members of the United States House of Representatives from New York (state)
19th-century American politicians
Politicians from the Bronx
West Farms, Bronx
19th-century American judges
19th-century American lawyers